The 2013 Interprovincial Championship was the first season of the Inter-Provincial Championship, the domestic multi-day cricket competition of Ireland. The competition was between Leinster Lightning, Northern Knights and North West Warriors.

The inaugural Inter-Provincial Championship was won by the Leinster Lightning, who clinched the title with one match to spare.  Despite falling just four runs short of victory in their opening match, they then won their next two games before closing with a hard-fought, high-scoring draw against Northern Knights in the last game of the year at Waringstown.

The Inter-Provincial Series has been funded at least partly by the ICC via their TAPP programme.

Table

Squads

Fixtures

Records

Highest Individual Innings

Best Bowling in an Innings

Season Aggregates

Most runs

Most wickets

See also
2013 Interprovincial One-Day Trophy
2013 Interprovincial Twenty20 Cup

References and notes

External links
Cricket Ireland | Live Scores, News, Photos, Players-official website

Inter-Provincial Championship seasons
Inter